Nils Ebbe Knut Carlsson (28 September 1947 – 3 August 1992) was a Swedish journalist and publisher with connections within the Social Democratic leadership and the Government of Sweden. He became infamous through the Ebbe Carlsson affair, when it was revealed that Carlsson was carrying out an independent and illegal investigation into the assassination of Olof Palme.

On 30 November 1991, Carlsson made public in an interview with Stina Dabrowski that he was HIV positive and was suffering from AIDS, making him one of the first famous Swedish people to make this public. Carlsson received medical treatment at the AIDS clinic of Karolinska University Hospital in Huddinge, Stockholm, during the last months of his life.

References 

1947 births
1992 deaths
People from Gothenburg
Swedish newspaper editors
AIDS-related deaths in Sweden